George Farmer (born 1862) was an English footballer who played for Stoke.

Career
Farmer was born in Stoke-upon-Trent and played football with Tunstall before joining Stoke in 1886. He played once in FA Cup in the 1886–87 season which came in a 6–4 defeat to Crewe Alexandra. He left Stoke at the end of the season and later joined Burslem Swifts.

Career statistics

References

English footballers
Stoke City F.C. players
1862 births
Year of death missing
Association football wing halves